Christophe Rousset (born 12 April 1961) is a French harpsichordist and conductor, who specializes in the performance of Baroque music on period instruments. He is also a musicologist, particularly of opera and European music of the 17th and 18th centuries and is the founder of the French music ensemble Les Talens Lyriques.

Biography
Rousset was born in Avignon, France on 12 April 1961. He studied harpsichord at La Schola Cantorum de Paris with Huguette Dreyfus, and subsequently at the Royal Conservatory of The Hague with Bob van Asperen winning the prestigious First Prize in the 7th Bruges Harpsichord Competition at the age of 22. This was followed by the creation of his own ensemble, Les Talens Lyriques, in 1991. At the heart of the ensemble is Rousset's research and expertise across the music of the Baroque, Classical and early Romantic periods.

Having initially attracted the notice of the international press and record companies for his proficiency as a harpsichordist, he thereafter made his mark as a gifted conductor, with invitations to perform with his ensemble at venues throughout the world, including among them Paris Opera, De Nederlandse Opera, Théâtre des Champs-Élysées, Salle Pleyel, Opéra de Lausanne, Teatro Real, Theater an der Wien, Opéra Royal de Versailles, Théâtre Royal de la Monnaie, Barbican Centre, Carnegie Hall, Concertgebouw Amsterdam, the Aix-en-Provence and Beaune festivals.

Alongside this, he has continued to pursue an active career as harpsichordist and chamber musician, performing and recording on the most beautiful period instruments. His complete performances of the works for harpsichord by François Couperin, Jean-Philippe Rameau, d’Anglebert and Forqueray and various recordings of pieces by Johann Sebastian Bach (Partitas, Goldberg Variations, Concertos for harpsichord, English Suites, French Suites and the Klavierbüchlein), are considered to be landmark references. His most recent album, devoted to a musical monument by the German Cantor, Book II of The Well-Tempered Clavier (on Aparté)—recorded at the Château of Versailles on a harpsichord by Joannes Ruckers (1628)—has won numerous awards, including a "Choc" from Classica magazine and "CD of the Week" from BBC Radio 3. In addition, instruments from the collection of the Museum of Music in Paris, have been entrusted to him for the recording of three records devoted to Royer, Rameau and Froberger.

Teaching is also of major importance for Christophe Rousset, who conducts and organises master classes and academies for young people (Accademia Musicale Chigiana in Siena, CNSMD Paris, Académie d’Ambronay, Orchestre Français des Jeunes Baroques, Jeune Orchestre Atlantique, Junge Deutsche Philharmonie, the Britten-Pears Orchestra) and he devotes himself with great energy, alongside the musicians of Les Talens Lyriques, to introducing young secondary school pupils in Paris to music.

Rousset also has enjoyed a career as guest conductor with Liceu Barcelona, Teatro San Carlo Naples, Teatro alla Scala, Royal Opera of Wallonia, Orquesta Nacional de España, London's Royal Opera House, Orchestra of the age of Enlightenment among other orchestras, and has actively pursued musical research, producing critical editions and the publication in 2007, by Actes Sud, of a study on Rameau.

Christophe Rousset has been awarded the French honours of Chevalier of the Legion of Honour, Commandeur in the Ordre des Arts et des Lettres and Chevalier in the Ordre national du Mérite.

Recordings

As a harpsichordist
 Johann Sebastian Bach, Double Concertos, 1982 – L'Oiseau Lyre
 Luigi Boccherini, Quatuor pour deux clavecins, 1986 – Harmonia Mundi
 Jean-Philippe Rameau, Intégrale des Pièces de clavecin, 1991 – L'Oiseau Lyre
 Johann Sebastian Bach, Italian Concerto BWV 971, French Overture BWV 831, Chromatic Fantazy & Fugue BWV 903, 1992 – L'Oiseau Lyre
 Johann Jakob Froberger, Suites et Toccatas, 1992 – Harmonia Mundi
 François Couperin, Troisième Livre de Pièces de Clavecin, 1993 – Harmonia Mundi
 Wilhelm Friedemann Bach, Pièces pour clavecin seul, 1993 – Harmonia Mundi
 Pancrace Royer, Pièces de clavecin, 1993 – L'Oiseau Lyre
 Johann Sebastian Bach, Partitas BWV 825–830, 1993 – L'Oiseau Lyre
 François Couperin, Quatrième Livre de Pièces de Clavecin, 1994 – Harmonia Mundi
 François Couperin, Deuxième Livre de Pièces de Clavecin, 1994 – Harmonia Mundi
 Johann Sebastian Bach, Goldberg Variations, 1995 – L'Oiseau Lyre
 Gaspard Le Roux, Intégrale des pièces de clavecin, 1995 – L'Oiseau Lyre
 François Couperin, Premier Livre de Pièces de Clavecin, 1995 – Harmonia Mundi
 Johann Sebastian Bach, Concertos pour clavecins et orchestre BWV1053, 1055, 1058, 1995 – L'Oiseau Lyre
 Franz Xaver Richter, Flötenmusik, Takashi Ogawa – RBM, 1996
 Wilhelm Friedemann Bach, Douze Polonaises, 1996 – Veritas/Virgin
 François Couperin, Intégrale Pièces de clavecin (1–4 Livres), 1996 – Harmonia Mundi
 Johann Sebastian Bach, Concertos pour clavecins et orchestre BWV1052, 1054, 1056, 1042, 1997 – L'Oiseau Lyre
 Johann Sebastian Bach, Intégrale des concertos pour clavecin, 1998 – Decca
 Domenico Scarlatti, Sonates pour Clavecin, 1998 – Decca
 Jean-Henri d'Anglebert, Intégrale des pièces de clavecin, 2000 – Decca
 Antoine Forqueray, Pièces de clavecin, 2001 – Decca
 Johann Sebastian Bach, Suites Anglaises, 2003 – Naïve-Ambroisie-Astrée
 Johann Sebastian Bach, Suites Françaises, 2004 – Naïve-Ambroisie-Astrée
 Johann Sebastian Bach, Klavierbuchlein fürWilhem Friedemann, 2005 – Naïve-Ambroisie-Astrée
 Pancrace Royer, Pancrace Royer, 2008 – Naïve-Ambroisie-Astrée
 Jean-Philippe Rameau, Les Indes Galantes, 2009 – Naïve-Ambroisie-Astrée
 Johann Jakob Froberger, Johann Jakob Froberger, 2010 – 2-Astrée
 Louis Couperin, Louis Couperin, 2010 – Aparté
 Johann Sebastian Bach, Bach Fantasy, 2010 – Aparté
 Jean-Philippe Rameau & Louis Marchand, Marchand, Rameau, 2012 – Ambronay Editions
 Jacques Duphly, Jacques Duphly, 2012 – Aparté
 Johann Sebastian Bach, Das Wohltemperierte Klavier The Well-Tempered Clavier, volume 2, 2013 – Aparté
 Claude-Bénigne Balbastre, Pièces de clavecin livre I, 2017 - Aparté
 Armand-Louis Couperin, Pièces de clavecin, 2017 – Aparté
 François Couperin, Première et deuxième suite pour viole, 2018 - Aparté
 Louis Couperin, Nouvelles suites, 2018 – Harmonia Mundi
 Girolamo Frescobaldi, Toaccate e partite, 2019 – Aparté
 Marin Marais, Pièces de viole Livre I, 2020 – Aparté
 Le manuscrit de Madame Théobon, 2020 – Aparté

As a conductor

Operas
 Scipione (George Frideric Handel), 1993 – Fnac / 2010 – Aparté
 Armida abbandonata (Niccolò Jommelli), 1994 – Fnac / 2005 – Ambroisie
 L’incoronazione di Poppea (Claudio Monteverdi), 1994 – TV : NPS/ 2005 – DVD : Opus Arte
 Riccardo Primo (Handel), 1996 – L’Oiseau-Lyre
 Les fêtes de Paphos (Jean-Joseph Cassanéa de Mondonville), 1997 – L’Oiseau-Lyre
 Mitridate, re di Ponto (Wolfgang Amadeus Mozart), 1999 – Decca
 Antigona (Tommaso Traetta), 2000 – L’Oiseau-Lyre
 Serse (Handel), 2000 – TV / 2005 – DVD : TDK
 Persée (Jean-Baptiste Lully), 2001 – Astrée Naïve
 La capricciosa corretta (Vicente Martín y Soler), 2004 – Naïve Astrée
 Roland (Lully), 2004 – Ambroisie
 La grotta di Trofonio (Antonio Salieri), 2005 – CD (with bonus making of DVD) Ambroisie
 Philémon & Baucis (Le feste d'Apollo) (Christoph Willibald Gluck), 2006 – Ambroisie-Naïve-Astrée
 Zoroastre (Jean-Philippe Rameau), 2006 – TV / 2007 – DVD : Opus Arte
 Il burbero di buon cuore (Martín y Soler), 2007 – TV / 2009 – DVD : Dynamic / 2010 : CD : Dynamic 
 Vénus & Adonis (Henry Desmarest), 2007 – Ambroisie-Naïve
 Il Califfo di Bagdad (Manuel Garcia), 2007 – Archiv Produktion (Donwroad only)
 Il tutore burlato (Martín y Soler), 2007 – L’Oiseau-Lyre (Spain only)
 Les grandes eaux musicales de Versailles (Lully, Rameau, Gluck, Desmarest), 2008 – CD : Ambroisie
 Castor & Pollux (Rameau, 2008 – DVD : Opus Arte
 Bellérophon (Lully), 2011 – Aparté
 Médée (Luigi Cherubini), 2012 – DVD/Blu-ray Bel Air Classiques
 Hercule mourant (Antoine Dauvergne), 2012 – Aparté
 Renaud (Antonio Sacchini), 2013 – Palazzetto Bru Zane
 Phaëton (Lully), 2013 – Aparté
 Amadis (Lully), 2014 – Aparté
 Les Danaïdes (Salieri), 2015 – Palazzetto Bru Zane
 L’affaire Tailleferre, Quatre opéras bouffes (Germaine Tailleferre), 2015 – DVD : Canopé Éditions  
 Zaïs (Rameau), 2015 – CD Aparté
 Les Indes galantes (Rameau), 2015 – DVD : Alpha
 Alcina & Tamerlano (Handel), 2015 – Web Streaming / 2016 – Blu-ray : Wahoo
 Uthal (Étienne-Nicolas Méhul), 2015 – Web Radio / 2017 – Palazzetto Bru Zane 
 Armide (Lully), 2015 – Aparté
 Pygmalion (Rameau), 2017 – Aparté
 Alceste (Lully), 2017 – Aparté
 Les Horaces (Salieri), 2018 – Aparté
 Tarare (Salieri), 2019 – Aparté
 Faust (Gounod), 2019 – Palazzetto Bru Zane
 Isis (Lully), 2019 – Aparté
 La Morte d'Orfeo (Landi), 2020 – DVD : Naxos
 Armida (Salieri), 2021 – Aparté
 Psyché (opera) (Lully), 2023 - Château de Versailles Spectacles

Vocal
 Henry Du Mont, Motets en dialogue, 1992 – Fnac Music / re-release : Virgin Veritas
 Pascal Collasse, Cantiques spirituels de Jean Racine, 1993 – Fnac Music
 François Couperin, Motets, 1993 – Fnac Music
 Daniel Danielis, Motets, 1993 – Koch Schwann
 Farinelli, Il castrato, Original soundtrack (Handel, Riccardo Broschi, Porpora, Johann Adolph Hasse, Pergolesi), 1994 – Astrée-Auvidis / Re-release : Naïve
 Farinelli – A portrait, live in Bergen/Ann Hallenberg, Haendel Riccardo Broschi, Giacomelli, Porpora, Johann Adolph Hasse, Leonardo Leo 2016 – Aparté
 Daniel Danielis, Motets d’Uppsala, 1997 – Cyprès
 Roberto Scaltriti (bariton) : Amadeus & Vienna (Mozart, Haydn, Soler, Cimarosa, Salieri, Giuseppe Gazzaniga, Sarti), 1998 – Decca
 Giovanni Battista Pergolesi, Stabat Mater – Salve Regina, 1999 – Decca
 Giovanni Battista Pergolesi, Stabat Mater, 2020 - Outhere
 François Couperin, Leçons de ténèbres, Motets, Magnificat, 2000 – Decca
 Leonardo Leo, Miserere – Musique sacrée, 2002 – Decca
 María Bayo (soprano) : Arias de Zarzuela barroca (José de Nebra, Antonio Rodríguez de Hita, Martín y Soler), 2003 – Naïve
 Sandrine Piau (soprano) : Handel Opera seria, 2004 – Naïve
 Wolfgang Amadeus Mozart, Betulia liberata, 2019 - Aparté
 Véronique Gens (soprano) : Tragédiennes, de Lully à Gluck, 2006 – Virgin
 Sandrine Piau : Mozart Airs sacrés, 2006 – DVD : Armide classics
 Joyce DiDonato (mezzo-soprano) : Furore, Handel Opera Arias , 2008 – Virgin Classics
 Véronique Gens : Tragédiennes 2, de Gluck à Berlioz, 2009 – Virgin Classics
 Véronique Gens : Tragédiennes 3, Héroïnes romantiques (Méhul, Rodolphe Kreutzer, Salieri, Gluck, Gossec, Meyerbeer, Auguste Mermet, Berlioz, Saint-Saëns, Massenet, Verdi), 2011 – Virgin Classics
 François Couperin, Couperin et moi, 2018 – Aparté
 Jean-Baptiste Lully, Ballet royal de la Naissance de Vénus, 2021 - Aparté

Instrumental
 Jean-Marie Leclair, Ouvertures et sonates en trio, 1993 – Fnac Music
 Lully, Campra, Marin Marais, André Cardinal Destouches, Jacques Cordier, Musiques à danser à la cour et à l’opéra, 1995 – Erato
 Jean-Philippe Rameau, Ouvertures, 1997 – Decca
 François Couperin, Les goûts réunis, 2001 – Decca
 Jean-Philippe Rameau, Six concerts en sextuor, 2003 – Decca
 François Couperin, Les Nations, 2018 – Aparté
 François Couperin, Couperin et moi, 2018 – Aparté
 François Couperin, Concerts Royaux, 2018 – Aparté

Merits and awards
 1983—Was awarded first prize at the 7th International Harpsichord Competition at Bruges
 1993—Was awarded the "Diapason d’Or" for his interpretation of Royer's Pièces de Clavecin.
 1995—Received the "Award for 17th and 18th Century Chamber/Solo Instrumental Music" at the Cannes Classical Awards for his recording of the Bach Partitas.
 2004—Received the "médaille de Chevalier dans l'Ordre national du Mérite" from the France's Minister of Culture, Donnedieu de Vabres.
 2013—Received the Traetta Prize from the Traetta Society for his work in the rediscovery of the roots of European music.

References

External links
 http://www.lestalenslyriques.com/
 Interview (French) on Anaclase.com
 Interview (French) about Traetta's Antigona on Traetta.com
 Interview (in French) on Lully's Roland on Odb-opera.com
 Interview (in French) on goldbergweb.com

1961 births
Living people
Musicians from Avignon
French harpsichordists
French performers of early music
French choral conductors
French male conductors (music)
Schola Cantorum de Paris alumni
Commandeurs of the Ordre des Arts et des Lettres
Knights of the Ordre national du Mérite
Chevaliers of the Légion d'honneur
21st-century French conductors (music)
21st-century French male musicians